Tantara Records is a recording label owned by Brigham Young University (BYU) and operated by the BYU School of Music.  The mission of Tantara is to promote the musical works of BYU, both by its various vocal and instrumental ensembles and also the works of its faculty who are musical composers, artists or directors.

Multiple works by the BYU Singers, BYU Concert Choir, BYU Men's Chorus, BYU Women's Chorus and Vocal Point have been published by Tantara.  Tantara also distributes works by BYU's various bands, orchestras and ensembles.  It also operates the Heritage endowment to promote the works of major LDS composers and serves as the distribution arm for the Barlow Endowment.

The main producer for Tantara Records is Ronald W. Simpson, a 1982 BYU graduate.  Simpson also serves as division coordinator for media music within the School of Music and as associate director of the BYU Young Ambassadors.  As of 2004 Simpson and Benjamin Fales, the operations manager, were the only full-time employees of Tantara although it also employed student interns.

The idea for Tantara Records was developed by K. Newell Dayley, who was then the chair of BYU's School of Music, along the model of the university press.  The decision to go through with it was brought about in large part because of the non-standard rates music publishers threatened to charge BYU in the matter of its publication of the album An American Tradition of Folk Hymns.

References
BYU Magazine Fall, 2002
Deseret News Mar 21, 2004 article on Tantara

External links
 Official website

Brigham Young University
American record labels
1993 establishments in Utah